Hinanit is an Israeli settlement in the northern West Bank. It is organised as a community settlement and falls under the jurisdiction of Shomron Regional Council. Hinanit is located just across the Green Line border with Israel in the northern West Bank's Jenin Governorate, and to the north abuts the Palestinian village of 'Anin, from which it is separated by Israel's West Bank barrier. It lies approximately 9 miles (15 km) west of Jenin city.

The international community considers Israeli settlements in the West Bank illegal under international law, but the Israeli government disputes this.

History
The village was established in 1981 by Mountain Jews from the Caucasus. Originally a moshav and a member of the Moshavim Movement, it was later converted to a community settlement.

References

Community settlements
Non-religious Israeli settlements
Former moshavim
 
Populated places established in 1981
1981 establishments in the Israeli Military Governorate
Israeli settlements in the West Bank